The Grand Hotel Prishtina is a hotel situated in the Mother Theresa Boulevard in downtown Pristina, the capital of Kosovo.

Prior to the Kosovo War of 1999, the hotel was owned by the Yugoslav government. Its owner now is Unio Commerce.

References

External links 
 BBC News: Who owns Pristina? July 28, 1999
 Virtual Tourist: Hotels in Priština

Buildings and structures in Pristina
Hotels in Kosovo
Hotels established in 1978
Hotel buildings completed in 1978